The tournament in New Delhi was a new addition to the ITF Women's Circuit.

Ivana Jorović won the title, defeating Barbara Haas in the final, 6–2, 6–2.

Seeds

Main draw

Finals

Top half

Bottom half

References 
 Main draw

QNet Open - Singles